Typhonium brownii, also known as the black arum lily, is a species of plant in the arum family that is endemic to Australia.

Description
The species is a deciduous, geophytic, perennial herb, which resprouts annually from a rhizome up to 15 cm long and 2–3 cm in diameter. The deeply trilobed to triangular leaves are borne on stalks up to 30 cm long. The inflorescence has a foecal smell and is pollinated by dung beetles; it is enclosed in a 20 cm long spathe, greenish on the outside and deep purple on the inside. Flowering takes place in summer. The fruits are reddish and about 10 cm in diameter.

Distribution and habitat
The species is known from south-eastern Queensland and New South Wales, where it grows in areas with rainforest, along the banks of creeks and in the spray zone of waterfalls.

References

 
brownii
Monocots of Australia
Flora of New South Wales
Flora of Queensland
Taxa named by Heinrich Wilhelm Schott
Plants described in 1855